Der Roland von Berlin is a historical novel by Willibald Alexis. Published in 1840, it was the basis for composer Ruggiero Leoncavallo's 1904 opera of the same name.

External links
 gutenberg.spiegel.de

References

1840 novels
German historical novels
19th-century German novels
Fiction set in 1422
Novels set in the 15th century